Hey Hey is a village in Shirin Darreh Rural District, in the Central District of Quchan County, Razavi Khorasan Province, Iran. At the 2006 census, its population was 1,452, in 351 families.

References 

Populated places in Quchan County